Faye Carol is a jazz and blues singer from Mississippi.

Biography 
Faye Carol was born in Meridian, Mississippi. After moving with her family to Pittsburg, California, she participated in youth choir at the Solomon Temple Missionary Baptist Church. She sang in blues bars after graduating from high school and won a talent contest in Oakland. She worked with locals blues musicians such as Eddie Foster, Johnny Heartsman, and Johnny Talbot. During the 1970s she became more of a cabaret singer.

From 2001 through 2013, Carol was founder and director of the Music in the Community program at the Black Repertory Group in Berkeley, California.

Discography

References

External links
Official site

American jazz singers
Living people
Musicians from Meridian, Mississippi
Musicians from Pittsburgh
Musicians from the San Francisco Bay Area
Singers from California
Singers from Mississippi
Singers from Pennsylvania
Year of birth missing (living people)
Jazz musicians from Pennsylvania
Jazz musicians from Mississippi
Jazz musicians from California